Tarryn Thomas (born 25 March 2000) is a professional Australian rules footballer playing for the North Melbourne Football Club in the Australian Football League (AFL).

Early life
Thomas was born in Sydney, New South Wales into a family of Indigenous Australian descent (Kamilaroi and Lumaranatana). He grew up playing rugby league and was identified as a junior prospect in the position of fullback which subsequently led to him joining the Penrith Panthers development academy. At 12 years of age, Thomas relocated to Launceston, Tasmania and began playing Australian rules football for the Prospect Hawks and eventually the North Launceston Bombers. 

He made history in 2016 when he was voted Tasmania's best under-16 and under-18 player at respective national championships in the same year. Thomas was drafted by North Melbourne with their first selection and eighth overall in the 2018 national draft, after being part of North's Next Generation Academy (NGA). He completed school at St Patrick's College, Launceston.

AFL career

Legal issues 
In 2023, Thomas was charged with threatening to distribute an intimate image. The charge was Thomas' second over the 2022-23 AFL off-season, after he was previously caught driving while his license was suspended.

Statistics
Statistics are correct to the end of the 2021 season.

|- style="background-color: #EAEAEA"
! scope="row" style="text-align:center" | 2019
|
| 26 || 20 || 16 || 15 || 114 || 126 || 240 || 47 || 68 || 0.8 || 0.8 || 5.7 || 6.3 || 12.0 || 2.4 || 3.4 
|-
! scope="row" style="text-align:center" | 2020
|
| 26 || 6 || 3 || 2 || 24 || 23 || 47 || 8 || 19 || 0.3 || 0.3 || 4.0 || 3.8 || 7.8 || 1.3 || 3.2 
|- style="background-color: #EAEAEA"
! scope="row" style="text-align:center" | 2021
|
| 26 || 21 || 24 || 17 || 233 || 149 || 382 || 96 || 73 || 1.2 || 0.9 || 10.9 || 6.7 || 17.6 || 3.3 || 3.7 
|- class="sortbottom"
! colspan=3| Career
! 47
! 43
! 34
! 371
! 298
! 669
! 151
! 159
! 0.9
! 0.7
! 7.8
! 6.3
! 14.2
! 3.2
! 3.3
|}

Notes

References

External links

2000 births
Living people
North Melbourne Football Club players
North Launceston Football Club players
Australian rules footballers from Tasmania
Indigenous Australian players of Australian rules football
Gamilaraay